The Jāmeh Mosque of Nā'īn ( – Masjid-e-Jāmeh Nā'īn) is the grand, congregational mosque (Jāmeh) of Nā'īn city, within Isfahān Province of Iran. Although the mosque is one of the oldest in Iran, it is still in use and is protected by Iran's Cultural Heritage Organization.

This mosque is perhaps one of the oldest mosques in Iran, and despite being built hundreds of years ago it still preserves its original architecture.  Arthur Pope believed that the mosque foundation goes back to 9th century. It has a very simple plan but is still very beautiful. The mosque contains a central rectangular courtyard that is surrounded with hypostyles on three sides. At one of these hypostyles the mihrab of the mosque is located. The mihrab at Islamic mosque is a niche at wall that shows the direction of "Qebleh" that is the direction of Mecca the holy city that Muslims prays towards it five times daily. This mihrab has an amazingly beautiful stucco work decoration, created probably during the 9th or 10th century. Also right beside it, there as an altar made of wood with delicate wooden inlay work.
The Mosque also has a 28-meter-high minaret belonging to the Seljuk era,10th century.

Specifications
The mosque is one of the oldest in Iran, dating back to the 9th century. The interiors however are Seljuki in brick craftsmanship, and therefore allude to the 11th century.

Like the Tarikhaneh of Damghan and the Jameh Mosque of Isfahan, this mosque is "Khorasani" in its architectural style.

Gallery

See also

Iranian architecture
List of mosques in Iran

9th-century mosques
Mosques in Isfahan Province
Buildings and structures in Isfahan Province
National works of Iran